The 1970 Torneio do Norte was the third edition of a football competition held in Brazil, featuring 6 clubs. Fast Clube won your first title and earn the right to play in the 1970 Torneio Norte-Nordeste.

Classification

References

Torneio do Norte
1970 in Brazilian football
Torneio do Norte